Sanjay Pahal (born 29 June 1993) is an Indian first-class cricketer who plays for Haryana. He made his Twenty20 debut for Haryana in the 2016–17 Inter State Twenty-20 Tournament on 29 January 2017. He made his List A debut for Haryana in the 2016–17 Vijay Hazare Trophy on 4 March 2017. Pahal has a right-hand batting style and a right-arm medium bowling style.

References

External links
 

1993 births
Living people
Indian cricketers
Haryana cricketers
People from Sonipat
Cricketers from Haryana